Linda Andrews (born 19 October 1973) is a Faroese singer who won the second season of the Danish version of The X Factor, and became the first Faroese winner of it.

Early life
She was born and raised in Tórshavn. She lived for many years with her father (a taxi driver) and mother in the western part of Torshavn called Vesturbýurin. She attended a Pentecostal church called Filadelfia until early adulthood. She was very active in youth work and in the choirs. During the early 1990s she became a known singer because of her appearance as one of the lead singers in Filadelfia. She also was in the Filadelfia Youth Choir and the Filadelfia Choir. She also sang with Vanja Carlsen (of the Carlsens) and was seen as a rival to the singer scene domination in the Filadelfia church. Later on in life she went Frydensberg and then after that she went to live abroad. She has a daughter, with whom she lives in Valby. Her daughter got her to join X Factor, and she eventually auditioned in Copenhagen. Andrews had recently divorced her husband of seven years, and she wanted to prove to her daughter that she could stand on her own feet. She comes from a large family in the Faroe Islands and has 4 older siblings. Prior to her rise to fame on X Factor, Andrews made her solo album debut in 2008 with Revelation, a gospel album, and prior to that, she released recordings such as "Hot Santa," a Christmas-themed novelty single from 2006.

Performances during X Factor

The X Factor
Throughout the series, she was mentored by Lina Rafn of Infernal. In the final, she sang "So What" by Pink and a new song written by Søren Rasted of Aqua and Hej Matematik.

Post X Factor
After winning the X Factor, she was offered a major-label recording contract with Sony Music. Andrews made her major-label début with "Det Bedste Til Sidst" written by Søren Rasted of the Danish pop band Aqua. The song was released in April 2009, just after Andrews had debuted the song on the season finale of X Factor (along with "So What" by P!nk). A couple months after releasing "Det Bedste Til Sidst," Andrews made her full-length album début with Into the Light (2009), primarily in English. It peaked at number two on the Danish albums chart and had two singles "Into the Light" and "Mirror Mirror". In 2013, she provided backing vocals for Hannah Mancini who represented Slovenia in the Eurovision Song Contest 2013 with the song, "Straight into Love". In 2017, she was one of the backing vocalists for Anja Nissen who represented Denmark in the Eurovision Song Contest 2017 with the song, "Where I Am". In 2018, she made another return to the contest, this time as a member of the Danish jury.

Discography

Studio albums
2008: Revelation
2009: Into the Light
2009: Husker du julen...
2011:  Tænder et lys

Singles
2006: "Hot Santa"
2006: "Divalicious"
2009: "Det bedste til sidst"
2009: "Into the Light"
2009: "Mirror Mirror"
2009: '"Tænder et lys (Til du kommer hjem)"
2013: '"Tears"
2013: '"Never gonna let you down"
 2013: '"Save Me" (TFX feat. Linda Andrews)
 2013: '"Jeg gi'r dig tid"
 2016: "Born again in your eyes"
 2017 "Save your love for me"
 2019 "Awake"

References

1973 births
Living people
People from Tórshavn
Faroese women singers
English-language singers from the Faroe Islands
The X Factor winners
21st-century Danish  women singers